Margaret Olivia Ensor Coolidge (October 16, 1908 − December 10, 2006) was a British-born American writer and educator. She published 27 books, many for young adults, including The Greek Myths (1949), her debut; The Trojan War (1952); Legends of the North (1951); Makers of the Red Revolution (1963); Men of Athens, one runner-up for the 1963 Newbery Medal; Lives of Famous Romans (1965); and biographies of Eugene O'Neill, Winston Churchill, Edith Wharton, Gandhi, and Tom Paine. 
Olivia Coolidge was born in London to Sir Robert Ensor, a journalist and historian. She earned a degree in Classics and Philosophy at Somerville College, Oxford, in 1931 and a Master's degree in 1940. In Germany, England and the U.S. she taught Greek, Latin, and English. In 1946 she married Archibald C. Coolidge of Connecticut, who had four children.

See also

References

External links 

 

1908 births
2006 deaths
American children's writers
Children's non-fiction writers
British emigrants to the United States
Newbery Honor winners
Alumni of Somerville College, Oxford
20th-century American non-fiction writers